Karenia papilionacea is a species from the genus Karenia, which are dinoflagellates. It was first discovered in New Zealand.

Description
Common to the genus Karenia, this species shares morphological characters such as a smooth theca and a linear apical groove on its apex. At the same time, this species can be distinguished from its cogenerates on the basis of morphological characteristics within its vegetative cells, including the location and shape of its nucleus; the excavation of its hypotheca; the characteristics of its apical and sulcal groove extensions on the epitheca; the shape of its cells, as well as their size and symmetry; the degree of dorsoventral compression; and the presence of an apical carina.

Species that present said dorsoventral compression are shown to swim in a distinctive fluttering motion.

Molecular phylogenetic analyses of rDNA indicates Karenia papilionacea, together with K. selliformis and K. bicuneiformis, is closely related to K. mikimotoi and K. brevis.

References

Further reading
Steidinger, Karen A., Jennifer L. Wolny, and Allison J. Haywood. "Identification of Kareniaceae (Dinophyceae) in the Gulf of Mexico.(With 9 figures and 1 table)." Nova Hedwigia Beihefte 133 (2008): 269.
Yeung, P. K. K., et al. "Characterization of a Karenia papilionacea-like dinoflagellate from the South China Sea." Journal of the Marine Biological Association of the United Kingdom 85.04 (2005): 779-781.
Gómez, Fernando. "The dinoflagellate genera Brachidinium, Asterodinium, Microceratium and Karenia in the open SE Pacific Ocean." Algae 21.4 (2006): 445-452.

External links

AlgaeBase

Gymnodiniales
Protists described in 2004
Dinoflagellate species